Pillsbury may refer to:

Business
 Pillsbury Company, a former producer of grain and other foodstuffs, a brand only after being bought in 2001
 Pillsbury Chemical and Oil, a defunct specialty chemical manufacturer
 Pillsbury Winthrop Shaw Pittman, an international law firm

Places

United States
 Pillsbury, Minnesota, an unincorporated community
 Pillsbury, North Dakota, a city
 Lake Pillsbury, an artificial lake in the Mendocino National Forest, California
 Pillsbury Crossing, a natural limestone crossing and waterfall in Riley County, Kansas
 Pillsbury Formation, a geologic formation in Kansas
 Pillsbury Lake, located northwest of Sled Harbor, New York
 Pillsbury Shale, a geologic formation in Kansas
 Pillsbury State Forest, Minnesota
 Pillsbury State Park, located mainly in Washington and partially in Goshen, New Hampshire

Elsewhere
 Pilsbury, a hamlet in the English county of Derbyshire

Other uses
 Pillsbury (surname), a list of people named Pillsbury or Pilsbury
 USS Pillsbury, two ships of the United States Navy

See also
 Pillsbury Point State Park, a state park located in Arnolds Park, Iowa